Larissa Maia Barata (born 31 March 1987) is a Brazilian group rhythmic  gymnast. She participated at the 2004 Summer Olympics. She also competed at world championships, including at the 2010  World Rhythmic Gymnastics Championships.

See also
List of Olympic rhythmic gymnasts for Brazil

References

External links
Larissa Barata at Sports Reference
http://www.gettyimages.com/detail/news-photo/larissa-barata-of-brazil-performs-her-routine-with-the-hoop-news-photo/2386422#larissa-barata-of-brazil-performs-her-routine-with-the-hoop-during-picture-id2386422

1987 births
Living people
Brazilian rhythmic gymnasts
Place of birth missing (living people)
Gymnasts at the 2003 Pan American Games
Gymnasts at the 2004 Summer Olympics
Olympic gymnasts of Brazil
People from Aracaju
South American Games gold medalists for Brazil
South American Games silver medalists for Brazil
South American Games medalists in gymnastics
Competitors at the 2002 South American Games
Competitors at the 2010 South American Games
Pan American Games competitors for Brazil
Sportspeople from Sergipe
20th-century Brazilian women
21st-century Brazilian women